The  was the 67th edition of NHK's Kōhaku Uta Gassen, held on December 31, 2016, live from NHK Hall from 19:15 (JST) to 23:45 (JST), with a 5-minute break for the latest news. This is the 28th Heisei Era edition. The broadcast schedule was announced on September 8. The  won this event.

This year's theme is: 夢を歌おう ("Yume o Utaō", "Let's Sing a Dream"). For the last time, Masaaki Hirao conducted "Hotaru no Hikari", seven months before his passing on July 21, 2017.

Broadcast

NHK revealed on September 8 that the 67th Kouhaku will air on December 31 (Saturday), starting from 19:15 JST and ending at 23:45 JST, with a 5-minute break for the latest news. In Japan, the broadcast takes place through NHK-G and Radio 1, and worldwide by NHK World Premium. In United States, the show is broadcast through TV Japan, starting around 15:10 (Eastern Time). Viewers outside Japan can watch Kouhaku on NHK World Premium, starting at 10:15 UTC, the same time as the NHK-G broadcast.

This year's theme is "Let's Sing a Dream" (夢を歌おう). It was revealed that the theme will remain unchanged through the 70th edition in 2019, in support of the upcoming 2020 Summer Olympics and 2020 Summer Paralympics. On November 12, Kasumi Arimura and Aiba Masaki were announced as the captains of the Red and White teams, respectively. On November 24, the list of program artists were announced, as well as this year's mediator,  Shinichi Takeda.

A special showcase from this year's Taiga Drama Sanada Maru is also being planned. On November 25, 2016, SPORTS NIPPON made a prediction of who will be the "Ootori" this year. Seiko Matsuda and Fuyumi Sakamoto are strong candidates for Akagumi, while Arashi is most likely to hold Ootori for Shirogumi. Ultimately, Arashi was chosen as Ootori.

On December 7, Tamori and Matsuko Deluxe were announced to appear as special guests. The song list was revealed on December 19. On December 21, the judges were revealed. On December 22, it was announced that "Fly into the Sun" composed by Shiro Sagisu would be used as the opening theme song. The song was written specially for the program. On December 23, SMAP officially declined their invitation to appear on Kouhaku. The performance order was announced on Christmas Day. Rehearsals started on December 28.

On December 31, the festival was broadcast live. The ball system was used for the first time in three years, and the winning team was Red team (9 balls against 6 White team). After Yoshimi Tendo's performance, viewer votes showed that Red team was in the lead with 444,495 vs 374,460 votes White. However, by half-time, White team had gained a significant lead with 1,435,175 vs 922,066 votes for Red. Final results showed that White team had won the viewer vote (4,203,679 White vs 2,527,724 Red) and venue vote (1,274 White vs 870 Red), garnering 4 balls. However, Red team won 9 guest judge votes vs 2 for White, bringing the final balls to 9 Red vs 6 White, culminating in Red team's victory. Red team captain Kasumi Arimura received the championship flag from the hands of guest judge Masao Kusakari.

With the 2016 victory, Red Team has accumulated 31 wins, while White Team continues with 36 victories.

Personnel

Main host and team leaders 
 Red Team Captain: Kasumi Arimura
 White Team Captain: Masaki Aiba (Arashi)
 Mediator: Shinichi Takeda

Live Comments 
Announcer NHK Radio 1: Naoki Ninomiya, Aiko Terakado
PR, Commentary: Bananaman, Naoko Hashimoto

Judges
 Osamu Akimoto (manga artist), creator of Kochikame
 Yui Aragaki (actress), starred in Nigehaji
 Kaori Icho (freestyle wrestler), gold medal in 2016 Olympics
 Shohei Ohtani (baseball player)
 Masao Kusakari (actor), played Sanada Masayuki in Taiga Sanada Maru
 Shota Shunputei (comedian)
 Mitsuki Takahata (actress), starred in Asadora Toto Neechan
 Sae Tsuji (athlete), bronze medal in 2016 Paralympics
 Kosuke Hagino (swimmer), gold medal in 2016 Olympics
 Sayaka Murata (writer), won the 155th Akutagawa Prize

Special Guests 
 Tamori
 Matsuko Deluxe
 Paul McCartney 
 Godzilla

Live Music Performance 
 Oomisoka Ongakutai (Conducted by: Nobuo Kurita)

Contestants
Debuting or returning artists are in bold.

Artists not attending this year
RED TEAM Miki Imai, NMB48, Sakurako Ohara, Natsuko Godai, Superfly, Ayako Fuji, Misia, μ's, Rebecca, Akiko Wada
WHITE TEAM Exile, Gesu no Kiwami Otome, Golden Bomber, Masahiko Kondō, SMAP, Hideaki Tokunaga, Bump of Chicken, Takashi Hosokawa, Akihiro Miwa, Shinichi Mori

Performance Order
Kanjani8 and Puffy were the first artists to perform. The final performers were Sayuri Ishikawa and Arashi, thus making this Arashi's first "Ootori". Five artist performed live from a remote location: Ringo Shiina & Tokio (from Tokyo Metropolitan Government Building), Masaharu Fukuyama (from Pacific Convention Plaza Yokohama), Hikaru Utada (from London, United Kingdom), and Kiyoshi Hikawa (from Kumamoto Castle).

Songs performed on medleys
 Puffy: "Asia no Junshin", "Nagisa ni Matsuwaru Et Cetera"
 Sekai no Owari: "RPG", "Hey Ho"
 V6: "Wa ni Natte Odorou", "Honey Beat"
 Fukuyama Masaharu: "Shounen", "1461 days"
 AKB48: "River", "Flying Get", "Kimi wa Melody"
 Arashi: "Arashi", "Happiness", "One Love"

Final Results & Ratings

Trivia
 This year's theme was announced in support of the 2020 Olympics and Paralympic Games, which will be held in Tokyo, with the same theme being retained through the 70th Kouhaku.
 SMAP will not be making their final appearance before their disbandment in Kōhaku Uta Gassen, as many had hoped.
 Masaki Aiba of Arashi will be captain of the White Team for the sixth time (counting the other five times, along with the other members of Arashi, between 2010 and 2014). This time, for the first time, Arashi is chosen for Ootori.
 On November 21, Takashi Hosokawa refused his invitation and announced his retirement from Kouhaku. Akiko Wada will not attend this year.
 This Kōhaku marked Ikimono-gakari's last TV performance. The group announced their hiatus on January 5, 2017.
 In 2017, it will be 10 years since the last episode of "Pop Jam" was aired. On this occasion, The Yellow Monkey performed "JAM".
 "Furusato" was performed again, since their last appearance in the 65th edition. All artists performed. This song is featured on Arashi's 2015 album Japonism.
 For the first time, all the Sakamichi Series groups performed in the same edition. In counterpart, only AKB48 (from AKB48 GROUP) was performed on NHK Hall. Haruka Shimazaki, Haruna Kojima and Nanami Hashimoto performed for the last time as members from AKB48 and Nogizaka46 respectively.
 Kiyoshi Hikawa released his first single with a theme song from an anime series. "Limit Breaking x Survivor" is the second opening theme from Dragon Ball Super starting from episode 77. It was released on August 26, 2017.
 Ringo Shiina performed alongside the former members of Tokyo Jihen in this Kōhaku. The band, however, was not officially reuniting.
 "Ai no Sanka" is a Japanese version of the song "L'hymne a l'amour", originally recorded by Edith Piaf.
 Masaaki Hirao conducted "Hotaru no Hikari" for the last time, seven months before his death on July 21, 2017. Starting from 68th edition, it will be replaced by Shunichi Tokura.

References

NHK Kōhaku Uta Gassen events
2016 in Japanese music
2016 in Japanese television